The 2013–14 FC Schalke 04 season was the 110th season in the club's football history. In 2013–14 the club plays in the Bundesliga, the top tier of German football. It is the club's 22nd consecutive season in the Bundesliga, having been promoted from the 2. Bundesliga in 1991.

Review and events

June – August

Ibrahim Afellay, Raffael and Christoph Moritz left the club. Christoph Metzelder retired from football.

Fixtures and results

Legend

Friendly matches

 Raúl played his Farewell game for Schalke 04. He played the first half by Al Sadd SC and the second by Schalke 04.

Bundesliga

League fixtures and results

League table

Results summary

DFB–Pokal

UEFA Champions League

Play–off round

Group stage

Round of 16

Team statistics

Player information

Squad

Squad statistics

Appearances and goals

 Gerald Asamoah has no professional contract, he usually play at FC Schalke 04 II.
 Philipp Max has no professional contract, he usually play at FC Schalke 04 II.
 Leroy Sané has no professional contract, he usually play at FC Schalke 04 Youth system.

Minutes played

 Gerald Asamoah has no professional contract, he usually play at FC Schalke 04 II.
 Philipp Max has no professional contract, he usually play at FC Schalke 04 II.
 Leroy Sané has no professional contract, he usually play at FC Schalke 04 Youth system.

Discipline

Bookings

 Gerald Asamoah has no professional contract, he usually play at Schalke 04 II.
 Philipp Max has no professional contract, he usually play at Schalke 04 II.
 Leroy Sané has no professional contract, he usually play at Schalke 04 Youth system.

Suspensions

Transfers

In

Out

Kits

Notes
1.Kickoff time in Central European Time/Central European Summer Time.
2.Schalke 04 goals listed first.

References

FC Schalke 04 seasons
Schalke 04 season 2013-14
Schalke 04